The Glencarron Estate is a 12,000 acre highland estate in Wester Ross. It provides sports facilities for fishing (river and loch) and grouse shooting. Several cottages and lodges are available for holiday lets. It is owned by Alasdair Douglas, chair of The Tree Council.

References

External links
 

Highland Estates
Ross and Cromarty